Ali Sher Khan Anchan (Balti: ཨལི་ཤེར་ཁན་ཨནཆན་།, Urdu: علی شیر خان انچن) (also called Ali Rai, Ray Alī, Alī Rai, Raja Sher Ali Mir, Mir Ali, Sher Ali and Ali Zad; 1590–1625) was a famous Balti king. He was a Maqpon dynasty king who unified Baltistan and expanded its frontiers to Ladakh and western Tibet  in the east, and in the west to the borders of Ghizar and Chitral.

Military Achievements

Anchan and Mughals
Anchan came into contact with the Mughal court. In the Balti version, Ali Sher Khan Anchan lost his royal father as a child. His maternal uncle, the Raja of Shigar, took him and his mother to Shigar. The intention was probably to put him to death and annex the Skardu Kingdom, the boy's inheritance, to his Kingdom of Shigar. At the age of 18, with twelve faithful followers of his father, Ali Sher Khan fled to Delhi. He was noticed by  Emperor Akbar when he showed his physical prowess by killing a lion while hunting in Delhi. The Emperor gave him the command of a Moghul army to reclaim his lost kingdom. While in Delhi, he married a Moghul princess named Gul Khatoon, the daughter of  Akbar's uncle, Kamran Mirza. In 1586 A.D., when Akbar conquered Kashmir, Ali Sher Khan Anchan was with him (referred to as Ali Rai by Mughal historians).

Conquest of Ladakh 
It is related that the Ladakhi kingdom once extended to Sermik in the west. During the reign of Ghazi Mir, the Ladakhis were driven out, not only from the Kharmang valley but from the entire district. of Purik (Kargil) was occupied by Ali Sher Khan, the heir apparent. He is said to have garrisoned the fort at Kharbu with soldiers and appointed a ‘Kharpon’ or governor to administer the border area.

A few years had not passed when the raja of Laddakh, Jamyang Namgyal, attacked the principalities of Purik (Kargil) annihilating the Skardu garrison at Kharbu and putting to the sword a number of petty Muslim rulers in the Muslim principalities of Purik. Ali Sher Khan Anchan, Sher Ghazi, Raja of Khaplu and Raja of Shigar left with a strong army by way of Marol, bypassed the Laddakhi army occupying Leh, the capital of Laddakh. It appears that the Balti conquest of Laddakh took place about 1594 A.D. The raja of Laddakh was ultimately taken prisoner. 

The raja of Laddakh sued for peace and since Ali Sher Khan's intention was not to annex Laddakh, he agreed on condition that the villages of Ganokh and Gagra Nullah (Grugurdo) should be ceded to Skardu and the Ladakh Raja should pay annual tribute. This tribute was paid through the Gonpa (monastery) of Lama Yuru till the Dogra conquest of Laddakh. Hashmatullah records that the head lama of the gompa had admitted before him the payment of yearly tribute to Skardu Darbar till the Dogra conquest of Laddakh.

The king of Laddakh offered his daughter in marriage to Ali Sher Khan.

Conquest of Dardistan and Chitral 
The incessant attacks on and plunder of villages in Roundu Baltistan, Dras, Gultari and Shingo Shigar by people from Gilgit, Chilas  and Astore while he was preoccupied with the campaigns in Laddakh, forced Ali Sher Khan Anchan to march on Gilgit with an Army worthy of his glorious name. He conquered Astore, Gilgit, Hunza, Nagar and Chilas. From Gilgit, he advanced to and conquered Chitral and Kafiristan.
To commemorate his victory he planted a Chinar Tree (Plane Tree) at Chitral near the village of Bronshel. In Balti folk songs and stories Chitral is known by the name of Brushal and this Chinar tree is referred to as Brosho Shingial or the Chinal of Broshal-corrupted form of Bronshal. In the folklore named after this Chinar of Brushal-Brosho Shingial, the exploits of Ali Sher Khan are enumerated and tribute is paid to the Anchan for his remarkable conquest and the boundary of his kingdom from Purang in the east to Brushal or Chitral in the West and in doing so, the Balti people have also been allowed to share the tribute. In one line the western and eastern boundaries of the Maqpon Empire have been defined as ‘Leh Purang na Brushal Shingel’ meaning ‘from Leh’s Purang to Brushal’s Chinar Tree’. 
He started Polo at Shundur Polo Ground first time.

Conquest of Kargil 
Ali Sher Khan Anchan conquered most of the principalities of Kargil and introduced Balti culture in the Kargil District.

Construction 
Anchan also took an interest in construction.
Water channel (stream) from Hargisa Nullah to Kachura
A water channel (stream) was constructed from Hargisa Nullah near Koshmara to Kachura lake. It was dug on the pattern of those found in Srinagar. Shikaras (small boats) ferried between Kushmara and Kachura. This stream had the twin purpose of providing irrigation to the people as well as recreation to the royal princesses. Ruins of the stream are still to be found in Giayul village.
  Bund at Satpar Lake
Ali Sher Khan is also credited with the construction of a dam on Satpara Lake, which irrigates Skardu. In the winter months the gates of the barrage closed and opened in springtime according to irrigation needs. This practice is followed even today.
   Kharfocho and Khache Khar
The construction of the Kharfocho Fort has been attributed by Hashmatullah to Maqpon Bukha or more correctly, Bugha, one of his ancestors. Cunningham and Moghal historians are of the view that the fort was constructed by Ali Sher Khan. Fosco Maraini says that everything of note in Skardu was credited to Ali Sher Khan.

References 

1590 births
1625 deaths
People from Gilgit-Baltistan
History of Baltistan
Balti people
People from Skardu District